71 Aquilae (abbreviated 71 Aql) is a binary star in the equatorial constellation of Aquila. 71 Aquilae is its Flamsteed designation though it also bears the Bayer designation l Aquilae. The apparent visual magnitude of the system is 4.33, making it bright enough to be viewed by the naked eye. At this distance, the brightness of the system is diminished by 0.065 in visual magnitude from extinction caused by interstellar gas and dust.

This is a spectroscopic binary system where the presence of an orbiting companion is revealed by shifts in the spectral lines caused by the Doppler effect. The primary component is a giant star with a stellar classification of G8 III. The secondary is following a circular orbit with a period of 205.2 days.

References

Aquila (constellation)
Spectroscopic binaries
G-type giants
Aquilae, l
Aquilae, 71
196574
101847
7884
BD-01 4016